The word Rhodia may refer to:

In Greek mythology (Ῥόδεια, Ῥοδία):
 Rhodea, Rhodeia, or Rhodia, one of the Oceanids
 Rhodia, one of the Danaïdes
 Rhodia, one of the Muses
 Rhodia, a fictional planet of the Nebula Kingdoms in Asimov's Empire Series
 437 Rhodia, an asteroid
 Rhodia (company), a French chemical company
 Clairefontaine-Rhodia branch of Clairefontaine paper mills who acquired French paper company Rhodia in 1997
 Rhodia, a city, also called Rhodiopolis, of ancient Lycia